Marwan ibn Muhammad ibn Marwan ibn al-Hakam (– 6 August 750), commonly known as Marwan II, was the fourteenth and last caliph of the Umayyad Caliphate, ruling from 744 until his death. His reign was dominated by a civil war, and he was the last Umayyad ruler to rule the united Caliphate before the Abbasid Revolution toppled the Umayyad dynasty.

Birth and background
Marwan ibn Muhammad was a member of the Marwanid household of the Umayyad Caliphate. His grandmother, named Zaynab. Marwan's father, Muhammad ibn Marwan, who was the son of the fourth Umayyad Caliph Marwan I, and hence half-brother to fifth Umayyad Caliph Abd al-Malik ibn Marwan.

His mother was a woman who's mostly unnamed, however sometimes is called Rayya or Tarubah, and is likely of non-Arab origin (a Kurd according to some accounts). Some have referenced that his mother was already pregnant with Marwan before his legal father, Muhammad, bed her, thus making the child not his. A couple sources report that Muhammad had taken her captive during the suppression of Ibn al-Zubayr's revolt.
There is much doubt and dispute on his mother's name but she was most commonly known as Umm Marwan (meaning "Mother of Marwan").

Early life
In 732–733, Caliph Hisham appointed Marwan governor of Armenia. In 735–736, Marwan invaded Georgia, devastated it and then took three fortresses of the Alans and made peace with Tumanshah. In 739–740, he launched further raids and obtained tribute.

In 744–745, on hearing news of the plot to overthrow al-Walid II, Marwan wrote to his relatives from Armenia strongly discouraging this. He urged them to harmoniously preserve the stability and well-being of the Umayyad house, however, this was disregarded and many armed men moved into Damascus. Yazid slipped into Damascus and deposed al-Walid in a coup, following this up with a disbursement of funds from the treasury.

Reportedly, Marwan II, who for several years had supervised the campaigns against the Byzantines and the Khazars on the Caliphate's northwestern frontiers, had considered claiming the caliphate at the death of al-Walid II, but a Kalbi rebellion had forced him to wait. Instead, Yazid III appointed him governor to Upper Mesopotamia and he took up residence in the Qays-dominated city of Harran. Throughout Yazid III's Caliphate Marwan remained a governor and he didn't claim the throne for himself.

Reign
When Yazid III persisted in overthrowing al-Walid II, Marwan at first opposed him, then rendered allegiance to him. On Yazid's early death (Yazid named his brother Ibrahim as his successor. Yazid fell ill of a brain tumour), Marwan renewed his ambitions, ignored Yazid's named successor Ibrahim, and became caliph. Ibrahim initially hid, then requested Marwan give him assurances of personal safety. This Marwan granted and Ibrahim even accompanied the new caliph to Hisham's residence of Rusafah.

Marwan named his two sons Ubaydallah and Abdullah heirs. He appointed governors and proceeded to assert his authority by force. However, the anti-Umayyad feeling was very prevalent, especially in Iran and Iraq. The Abbasids had gained much support. As such, Marwan's reign as caliph was almost entirely devoted to trying to keep the Umayyad empire together.

Marwan took Emesa (Homs) after a bitter ten-month siege. Al-Dahhak ibn Qays al-Shaybani led a Kharijite rebellion. He defeated the Syrian forces and took Kufa. Sulayman ibn Hisham turned against Marwan, but suffered a severe defeat. The Kharijites advanced on Mosul and were defeated. Sulayman joined them. Al-Dahhak's successor al-Khaybari was initially successful in pushing back Marwan's center and even took the caliph's camp and sat on his carpet. However, he and those with him fell into fighting in the camp. Shayban succeeded him. Marwan pursued him and Sulayman to Mosul and besieged them there for six months. Then, reinforced, the caliph drove them out. Shayban fled to Bahrayn where he was killed; Sulayman sailed to India.

In Khurasan there was internal discord, with the Umayyad governor Nasr ibn Sayyar facing opposition from al-Harith and al-Kirmani. They also fought each other. In addition, Abbasid envoys arrived. There had long been religious fervor and a kind of messianic expectation of Abbasid ascendency. During Ramadan of 747 (16 May – 14 June), the Abbasids unfurled the standards of their revolt. Nasr sent his retainer Yazid against them. Yazid, however, was bested, taken, and held captive. He was impressed by the Abbasids and when released told Nasr he wanted to join them, but his obligations to Nasr brought him back.

Fighting continued throughout Khurasan with the Abbasids gaining increasing ascendency. Finally, Nasr fell sick and died at Rayy on 9 November 748 at the age of eighty-five.

Marwan campaigned in Egypt in 749 to quell the Bashmuric Revolt and secure his rear, but his campaign was a failure. The Abbasids, meanwhile, achieved success in the Hijaz. Marwan suffered a decisive defeat by Abu al-Abbas al-Saffah on the banks of the Great Zab, called Battle of the Zab. At this battle alone, over 300 members of the Umayyad family died. Marwan fled, leaving Damascus, Jordan and Palestine and reaching Egypt, where he was caught and killed on 6 August 750. His heirs Ubaydallah and Abdallah escaped to modern Eritrea. Abdallah died in fighting there.

Marwan's death signaled the end of Umayyad fortunes in the East and was followed by the mass killing of Umayyads by the Abbasids. Almost the entire Umayyad dynasty was killed, except for the prince Abd ar-Rahman who escaped to Spain and founded an Umayyad dynasty there. In Egypt, Marwan's tongue was fed to a cat.

Physical description
Marwan was known to be of a fair complexion, with blue eyes, a big beard, big toes and of medium height. He did not dye his beard with Henna and left it white.

See also
 Marwan ibn Muhammad's invasion of Georgia
 Battle of the Zab
 Muhammad ibn Marwan

References

Bibliography
 

 
 
Sir John Glubb, "The Empire of the Arabs", Hodder and Stoughton, London, 1963
Syed Ameer Ali, "A Short History of the Saracens", Macmillan and co., London, 1912
 
 

691 births
750 deaths
8th-century Umayyad caliphs
8th-century rulers in Asia
8th-century rulers in Africa
8th-century rulers in Europe
Executed monarchs
8th-century executions by the Abbasid Caliphate
Arab generals
Generals of the Umayyad Caliphate
Umayyad people of the Arab–Khazar wars
People of the Third Fitna
People of the Abbasid Revolution
Umayyad governors of Arminiya
Umayyad governors of Mosul
Monarchs killed in action